Presstitute is a term that references journalists and 'talking heads' in mainstream media who give biased and predetermined views misleadingly tailored to fit a particular partisan, financial or business agenda, thus neglecting the fundamental duty to report news impartially. Coined by American researcher Gerald Celente, the word is a portmanteau of press and prostitute.

The term became popular in the social media after General Vijay Kumar Singh, the former Chief of Army Staff and Indian Union Minister of State for External Affairs, began referring to a section of the media as "presstitutes" in his tweets.

See also 

 Churnalism
 Fake news
 Lying press
 Media bias
 Yellow journalism
 Types of journalism

References 

Criticism of journalism
Newswriting